The Conservatoire de la monoplace française is a museum dedicated to the French Formula One cars located in Magny-Cours, France and created 1 May 2015.
It is located on the Circuit de Nevers Magny-Cours racetrack.

It brings together F1 cars from the Ligier, Prost Grand Prix and Renault Sport teams.

The circuit and the museum together have 310,000 visitors per year in 2016.

References

External link
 Conservatoire de la monoplace française

Nevers
Auto racing museums and halls of fame
Museums established in 2015